Giovanni Andrea Sirani (4 September 1610 – 21 May 1670) was an Italian Baroque painter from Bologna.

He is best known as the father of the female painter Elisabetta Sirani. Sirani trained initially with Giacomo Cavedone, then worked in the studio with Guido Reni. He became entangled in various conspiracies circling around the death of his daughter in 1665. While Giovanni accused a maid of poisoning his daughter, others saw Giovanni as the origin of death from stomach ulcer by overwork.

References
 Web Gallery of Art Biography

1610 births
1670 deaths
17th-century Italian painters
Italian male painters
Painters from Bologna
Italian Baroque painters